Junior Bake Off is a British television baking competition in which young bakers aged 9 to 15 tackle a series of challenges involving baking cakes, biscuits, bread, and pastries, competing to be crowned Junior Bake Off Champion.

The series debuted in 2011 as a spin-off from The Great British Bake Off and is also produced by Love Productions. Four series of Junior Bake Off were broadcast on CBBC from 2011 to 2016. Following its parent series' departure from the BBC in 2017, Junior Bake Off resumed with a fifth series in 2019 on Channel 4, with comedian Harry Hill as presenter and Prue Leith and Liam Charles as judges. The fifth series concluded on 22 November 2019. The show returned for a sixth series on 11 January 2021. Junior Bake Off returned Monday 10 January 2022 for its seventh series and concluded on 28 January 2022. Junior Bake Off returned on 16 January 2023 for its eighth series and will conclude on 3 February 2023. On 2 February it was announced that Junior Bake Off has been renewed for its ninth series to air in 2024.

Format

Each series of Junior Bake Off includes 15 episodes. While The Great British Bake Off features three challenges per episode (signature, technical, and showstopper), Junior Bake Off includes only the technical and showstopper challenges. In the first four series, aired on CBBC from 2011–16, the format featured 40 young bakers aged 9 to 12 years old divided into 10 qualifying rounds or heats. Each episode featured only four bakers, with one winner each episode and the other three eliminated. The winning baker from each heat were brought back for 'Finals Week' (divided into two semi-finals, followed by two finals, and then one grand final) which determined the winner.

The format was altered in 2019 when the series moved to Channel 4. The episodes were increased from 30 minutes to one hour, the number of bakers halved to 20 (16 from series 6), and the upper age range of the contestants increased from 12 to 15 (changed back to 12 from series 8). Instead of only four bakers taking part in each qualifying round, the bakers are divided into two groups of 10 each, with five eliminated from one group during the first five episodes, and five eliminated from the second group during the second five episodes. The remaining five bakers from each group are combined in the week-long finals, resulting in quarterfinals, semifinals and finals. The 'Star Baker' award, given to the judges' favourite baker in each episode, was not included in the CBBC version of the show but is a part of the Channel 4 format.

Series overview

Series 1 (2011)

The first series began on 31 October 2011 on CBBC with judges from the main show Paul Hollywood and Mary Berry. Aaron Craze presented the show.

Series 2 (2013)

A second series began on 11 November 2013 on CBBC. Chef James Martin replaced Hollywood as judge.

Series 3 (2015)

A third series began airing on 2 November 2015 on CBBC, with Sam Nixon and Mark Rhodes replacing Craze as hosts. Allegra McEvedy and Graham Hornigold took over from Berry and Martin as judges.

Series 4 (2016)

The fourth series began on 7 November 2016 on CBBC. Allegra McEvedy returns as judge with Nadiya Hussain replacing Graham Hornigold. Presenters Sam & Mark returned to host.

Series 5 (2019)

The fifth series began on 4 November 2019 on Channel 4. Harry Hill presented the series which was judged by Prue Leith and Liam Charles.

Series 6 (2021)

The sixth series of Junior Bake Off began on 11 January 2021 on Channel 4 with Ravneet Gill replacing Prue Leith.

Series 7 (2022)

The seventh series of Junior Bake Off began on 10 January 2022 on Channel 4. The series concluded on 28 January 2022.

Series 8 (2023)

The eighth series of Junior Bake Off began airing on 16 January 2023 on Channel 4. For the third series in a row, Harry Hill presented the series, which was judged by Ravneet Gill and Liam Charles.

International versions
There's a Brazilian version of Junior Bake Off called Junior Bake Off Brasil, which currently broadcasts on SBT.

References

External links
 
 

2011 British television series debuts
2010s British children's television series
2020s British children's television series
CBBC shows
BBC children's television shows
British television series revived after cancellation
English-language television shows
Channel 4 original programming
British television spin-offs
Reality television spin-offs
The Great British Bake Off
2010s British cooking television series
2020s British cooking television series
Television series about children
Television series about teenagers